The year 2004 is the 4th year in the history of World Extreme Cagefighting, a mixed martial arts promotion based in the United States. In 2004 WEC held 4 events beginning with, WEC 9: Cold Blooded.

Title fights

Events list

WEC 9: Cold Blooded

WEC 9: Cold Blooded was an event held on January 16, 2004, at the Tachi Palace in Lemoore, California, United States.

Results

WEC 10: Bragging Rights

WEC 10: Bragging Rights was an event held on May 21, 2004, at the Tachi Palace in Lemoore, California, United States.

Results

WEC 11: Evolution

WEC 11: Evolution was an event held on August 20, 2004, at the Tachi Palace in Lemoore, California, United States.

Results

WEC 12: Halloween Fury 3

WEC 12: Halloween Fury 3 was an event held on October 21, 2004, at the Tachi Palace in Lemoore, California, United States.

Results

See also 
 World Extreme Cagefighting
 List of World Extreme Cagefighting champions
 List of WEC events

References

World Extreme Cagefighting events
2004 in mixed martial arts